The Laskaris or Lascaris family was a Byzantine Greek noble family whose members formed the ruling dynasty of the Empire of Nicaea from 1204 to 1261 and remained among the senior nobility up to the dissolution of the Byzantine Empire, whereupon many emigrated to Italy and then to Smyrna (much later). According to George Pachymeres, they were also called Tzamantouros (Tζαμάντουρος). The feminine form of the name is Laskarina (Λασκαρίνα).

Etymology 
The origin of the name is unclear. In 1928, the Greek scholar Phaedon Koukoules proposed an origin from δάσκαρης, a Cappadocian variant for "teacher", but the δ>λ shift in Cappadocian is attested only in the late 19th century, so that its application to the mid-11th century or earlier is dubious. A year later, G. Stamnopoulos proposed an alternative etymology from the name Λάσκας or Λάσκος and the -άρις ending borrowed from the Latin -arius, but the Greek linguist K. Menas considered such an etymological evolution as unlikely. According to the Oxford Dictionary of Byzantium, the "most probable" etymology is the one proposed by B. Hemmerdinger in 1969, according to which the name derives from the Persian word Lashkarī (also , ʿaskarī), meaning "warrior, soldier". However, this interpretation is open to question since "the first known members of the Laskaris family [...] were simple peasants". The Greek historian D. Theodoridis instead suggested a derivation from the Arabic al-ʿashqar, "ruddy, blond", or also "sorrel".

History 
The first occurrence of the name is in 1059, in a will by Eustathios Boilas, but the people mentioned there were simple peasants. Another family surnamed Laskaris appears in Thessalonica from c. 1180 on, but the relation with the imperial dynasty, if any, is unclear.

The first Laskaris of note were Constantine and Theodore, the sons of Manuel Laskaris and Ioanna Phokaina Karatzaina (Ἰωάννα Φώκαινα Καράτζαινα), who became prominent in Constantinople during the latter years of the Angeloi dynasty, when Theodore had married Anna Komnene Angelina, a daughter of Alexios III Angelos. According to Niketas Choniates, immediately prior to the sack of the city by the Fourth Crusade, Constantine was elected emperor by the people, but had to flee before the Latins. Together with Theodore, he led the anti-Latin resistance of the native Byzantine Greek population in Asia Minor, but it was Theodore who established a new empire in exile, the Empire of Nicaea. There were also three older brothers, Manuel, Michael and George, and two younger ones, Alexios and Isaac.

Constantine died probably c. 1211. Theodore I, whose children Nikolaos and John died c. 1212, was succeeded in 1222 by his son-in-law, John III Doukas Vatatzes, who had married Irene Laskarina. Vatatzes had to fight off a rival claim by Isaac and Alexios, the brothers of Theodore I, who fled to the Latin Empire and sought aid. Vatatzes' victory at Poemanenum in 1224 however was decisive: it strengthened his own position and heralded a long and successful Nicaean offensive against the Latin holdings. Vatatzes died in 1254, leaving his son, Theodore II Laskaris on the throne. He died in 1258, leaving his infant son John IV Laskaris on the throne. The aristocratic faction around Michael Palaiologos then took control from the Laskarid loyalist George Mouzalon in a coup d'état, and installed Palaiologos as regent and, eventually, as co-emperor. Following the recapture of Constantinople in 1261, Palaiologos was crowned alone as emperor, while John IV was ignored. Soon after, he was blinded and lived imprisoned until his death in 1305.

Under the new Palaiologan dynasty, the Laskarids retained a certain prominence: several members of the family were local governors and courtiers. Among the most notable members are Manuel Laskaris, Domestic of the Schools c. 1320, and Alexios, a megas hetaireiarches c. 1370. John Pegonites Laskaris was a composer who lived in Venetian-held Crete in the first half of the 15th century, while the scholars Constantine Lascaris and John Ryndakenos Laskaris were among the many who fled the fall of the Byzantine Empire to the Ottomans and found refuge in Italy, where they helped spark the Renaissance.

In the 15th century, Laskaris Kananos wrote an account of his travels in northern Europe.

Laskarid emperors of Nicaea

 1204–1222 : Theodore I Laskaris
 1222–1254 : John III Doukas Vatatzes
 1254–1258 : Theodore II Laskaris
 1258–1261 : John IV Laskaris

In Italy

In 1269 the Count of Ventimiglia, Gugliemo Pietro I Balbo married Eudossia Laskaris, daughter of Emperor Theodore II Laskaris. From this union came the dynasty of the Lascaris of Tenda, who governed the sovereign County of Tenda until 1501 when the last of them, Anna Lascaris, married Renato of Savoy (in French René de Savoie) and transferred the County to his cadet branch of the Savoy dynasty. The most famous member of Ventimiglia branch of Lascaris was Giovanni Paolo Lascaris, Grand Master of the Knights of Malta. He constructed the Lascaris towers of Malta and attempted to create for Malta a Caribbean colonial empire.

Family tree of the Imperial House of Laskaris

See also
 Family tree of the Byzantine emperors
 Giovanni Paolo Lascaris
 Palais Lascaris
 House of Ventimiglia
 Alexander M. Laskaris

References

Sources 
 
 
 
 

Laskarid dynasty
Byzantine families
Greek noble families
Medieval royal families